Brent Erick Vigen (born March 19, 1975) is an American football coach and former player. Vigen is currently the head coach for the Montana State Bobcats. He was previously the associate head coach and offensive coordinator at the University of Wyoming. He has spent the majority of his coaching career on Craig Bohl's staffs.

Playing career
Vigen was a member of three NCAA Division II playoff teams (1994, 1995, and 1997) during his career at North Dakota State from 1993 through 1997. He played tight end and was a two year starter.

Coaching career

North Dakota State
Following his playing career, Vigen joined the coaching staff at North Dakota State as a graduate assistant for Bob Babich from 1998 to 2000. In 2001, he was promoted to a full-time position coaching the tight ends in 2001 and the quarterbacks in 2002. New head coach Craig Bohl assigned Vigen as the running backs coach for the 2003 season, before promoting him to passing game coordinator and quarterbacks coach from 2004 to 2008. Prior to the 2009 season, Vigen was again promoted, this time to offensive coordinator. Vigen remained in this role through the 2013 season, when he followed Bohl to a new opportunity.

Wyoming
When  Bohl was hired as the new head coach at Wyoming, Vigen went with him as Bohl's offensive coordinator and quarterbacks coach. In the spring of 2017, Vigen was promoted to associate head coach.

When North Dakota State head coach Chris Klieman left to become the head coach at Kansas State, Vigen was widely considered a candidate to replace Klieman as the head coach at North Dakota State, but ultimately he remained at Wyoming, and North Dakota State's defensive coordinator, Matt Entz, was promoted.

Montana State
In February of 2021, Vigen got his first head coaching job as the head coach at Montana State, replacing Jeff Choate.

Head coaching record

Personal life
Vigen and his wife, Molly, have three sons: Jake, Grant, and Luke. Molly played basketball at North Dakota State and was a member of the 1996 NCAA Division II National Championship team.

References

External links
 Montana State profile

1975 births
Living people
American football tight ends
Montana State Bobcats football coaches
North Dakota State Bison football players
North Dakota State Bison football coaches
Wyoming Cowboys football coaches
People from Traill County, North Dakota
Coaches of American football from North Dakota
Players of American football from North Dakota